Samuel Whitcomb Hyde (born 1985) is an American comedian. He co-created the sketch comedy group Million Dollar Extreme (MDE) with Charles Carroll and Nick Rochefort.

Hyde is known for his involvement in several public pranks and internet hoaxes. Hyde's transgressive style has also garnered public controversy, and his comedy and political views have been associated with the alt-right.

Life and career
After graduating from Wilton High School, Hyde enrolled at Carnegie Mellon University for one year before transferring to the Rhode Island School of Design, where he graduated in 2007 with a Bachelor of Arts in film, animation and video.

In mid-2014, Hyde started a web series titled Kickstarter TV, where he would find projects on Kickstarter and harshly ridicule both the projects and the people who made them.

In August 2016, Million Dollar Extreme Presents: World Peace, a television program Hyde co-wrote and acted in along with the other members of MDE, premiered on Adult Swim. Four months later, it was announced that World Peace would not be renewed for a second season. Hyde attributed the show's cancellation to his vocal support for Donald Trump.

In a December 2016 interview with The Hollywood Reporter in the aftermath of his series' cancellation, when questioned if he held a bias towards minorities, Hyde replied that he was 'probably as racist or as biased as the average regular white guy or the average regular black guy'.

In 2017, Hyde pledged $5,000 towards the legal defense fund of Andrew Anglin, the founder and editor of neo-Nazi website The Daily Stormer. The Southern Poverty Law Center sued Anglin for allegedly organizing a "troll storm" against a Jewish woman in Montana. When Matt Pearce of the Los Angeles Times questioned Hyde about the donation, Hyde asked Pearce if he was Jewish and went on to say that $5,000 was "nothing" to him. Hyde also stated: "Don't worry so much about money. Worry about if people start deciding to kill reporters. That's a quote. For the reason why, you can say I want reporters to know I make more money than them, especially Matt Pearce."

In 2022, iDubbbz uploaded a documentary on Hyde trying to understand and communicate with him beyond the irony and acts Hyde puts on. Hyde has been open about his interest in boxing and helped train Jewish-Canadian YouTuber Harley Morenstein for iDubbbz's charity boxing event, Creator Clash. On August 27, 2022, Hyde made his boxing debut, defeating Australian social media star James "IAmThmpsn" Thompson during the  2 Fights 1 Night event.

Pranks
Hyde lampooned the American anime fandom in 2012 when he delivered a spurious presentation titled "Samurai Swordplay in a Digital Age" under the pseudonym "Master Kenchiro Ichiimada" at a convention in Vermont. During the presentation, an MDE affiliate blocked the exit to bar attendees from leaving Hyde's hour-long performance. Similarly in 2013, Hyde, while dressed in a maroon-colored sweatsuit and clad in hoplite-esque breastplate and greaves, delivered a prank TEDx talk titled "2070 Paradigm Shift" at Drexel University. The talk, described by Forbes as a satiric impersonation of a "Brooklyn tech hipster," received significant media attention. When asked about the intent of the prank, Hyde stated his dislike for TED talks, calling them "really self-congratulatory."
In 2014, Hyde started a fake Kickstarter campaign to crowdfund the creation of a "pony dating simulator" for bronies, the adult male fans of the children's television show My Little Pony: Friendship is Magic. The Kickstarter page said the simulator would comprise "a journey that spans multiple continents" and include "deep RPG elements." Devotees of the show who ostensibly took the project seriously pledged a total of $4,161 to the fundraiser before Hyde cancelled it.

Shooting and terrorism hoaxes

Since 2015, Hyde has been frequently misreported as the perpetrator of numerous mass shootings and terrorist attacks by internet trolls on websites such as 4chan and Twitter. The hoaxes, which typically included photos of Hyde brandishing a semi-automatic weapon and with a slightly altered name to appear more "authentic", reappeared so often on social media that The New York Times characterized "Sam Hyde is the shooter" as "an identifiable meme."

The first instance of the prank was the Umpqua Community College shooting. CNN mistakenly included Hyde's image on their coverage of the shooting. Hyde was also labelled as the perpetrator in high profile shootings such as the Orlando Night Club shooting, Sutherland Springs church shooting (where he was misidentified by Representative Vicente Gonzalez) and the Las Vegas shooting in 2017. Hyde has also been erroneously blamed for many other small scale and large shootings.  Hyde's image was shared across social media as being the driver of the car in Waukesha, Wisconsin, that drove into a Christmas parade in November 2021. In February of 2022, an edited image of Hyde was misidentified as the "Ghost of Kyiv" (a Ukrainian fighter pilot who supposedly shot down six Russian planes on February 24, 2022) in popular social media posts including that of Representative Adam Kinzinger. The alleged pilot was given Ukrainian style names 'Сэм Хайденко' [Sam Haydenko] or Samuyil Hyde. The 2022 Buffalo shooter also claimed the image of Hyde as his own in his manifesto. In July 2022, multiple popular posts on social media falsely labelled Hyde as the gunman in the assassination of former Japanese Prime Minister Shinzo Abe.

Boxing record

Publications
Books
 How to BOMB the U. S. Gov't: The OFFICIAL Primo(tm) Strategy Guide to the Collapse of Western Civilization, with Nick Rochefort and Charls "Coors" Carroll. COM98 LLC (2016). .

Filmography
Television
 Million Dollar Extreme Presents: World Peace (2016, 6 episodes) – various, screenwriter, producer

Notes

References

External links

1985 births
Living people
People from Fall River, Massachusetts
American male comedians
American male film actors
American male television actors
American television writers
American performance artists
American sketch comedians
American stand-up comedians
Carnegie Mellon University alumni
Far-right politics in the United States
Rhode Island School of Design alumni
Comedians from Massachusetts
Screenwriters from Massachusetts
21st-century American comedians
American male television writers
Internet hoaxes
Internet memes
YouTube boxers
American conspiracy theorists
Wilton High School alumni
Alt-right